The Nationale 1 Hommes, officially named the Luxembourgish Basketball League (formerly known as the Total League), is the highest men's basketball league in Luxembourg. The league's governing body is Fédération Luxembourgeoise de Basketball (FLBB). Prior to the 2012–13 season, the league was known as the Diekirch League.

About
As the league is semi-professional, all clubs are run as not-for-profit. Each team in the league is allowed to have two American players on the roster. While most local players do not receive a salary, American players are paid.

There are two player statuses: JICL (French acronym for "player registered with a Luxembourgian club") and non-JICL. To be classified as JICL, a player has to have obtained a license from a FLBB club before their 16th birthday, or have one for at least three seasons between their 16th and 21st birthday. Prior to the 2013–14 season, each team was only allowed two non-JICL players, no exceptions. In July 2013, the European Commission adjudged the ruling was contrary to the Schengen Agreement. Following that decision, the rule was scrapped and replaced by a gentlemen's agreement to keep the number at two, though some have signed a third non-JICL player, arguing they were part-time players.

Format
During the regular season, each team plays the other nine teams twice, one at home and one away (10 teams, 18 games, 18 rounds). After this, the top six teams move on to the second stage, where they play a further 10 games against each other. The top four teams at the conclusion of the second stage move on to the playoffs. In the semi-finals, the No. 1 seed plays the No. 4 seed, and the No. 2 seed plays the No. 3 seed. The winner of each best-of-three semi-final moves on to the Finals series to decide the title (also best-of-three).

Meanwhile, the bottom four teams after the regular season join the best four teams from the second-tier Nationale 2 to play for relegation and promotion respectively. The two worst ranked Total League teams are relegated whilst the two best Nationale 2 teams are promoted.

Current clubs

Title holders 
  
 1933–34: Nitia
 1934–35: Nitia
 1935–36: Nitia
 1936–37: Nitia
 1937–38: Nitia
 1938–39: Nitia
 1939–40: Nitia
 1940–44: Not held
 1944–45: Nitia
 1945–46: Nitia
 1946–47: Nitia
 1947–48: Nitia
 1948–49: Nitia
 1949–50: Nitia
 1950–51: Nitia
 1951–52: Black Boys Kayl
 1952–53: Nitia
 1953–54: Nitia
 1954–55: Etzella
 1955–56: Etzella
 1956–57: Etzella
 1957–58: Sparta Bertrange
 1958–59: Rou'de Le'w Kayl
 1959–60: Sparta Bertrange
 1960–61: Etzella
 1961–62: Etzella
 1962–63: Etzella
 1963–64: Etzella
 1964–65: Etzella
 1965–66: Black Star Mersch
 1966–67: Racing Luxembourg
 1967–68: Black Star Mersch
 1968–69: Sparta Bertrange
 1969–70: Etzella
 1970–71: Amicale Steesel
 1971–72: Etzella
 1972–73: Amicale Steesel
 1973–74: Sparta Bertrange
 1974–75: T71 Dudelange
 1975–76: T71 Dudelange
 1976–77: T71 Dudelange
 1977–78: Amicale Steesel
 1978–79: Sparta Bertrange
 1979–80: Amicale Steesel
 1980–81: Amicale Steesel
 1981–82: T71 Dudelange
 1982–83: T71 Dudelange
 1983–84: T71 Dudelange
 1984–85: T71 Dudelange
 1985–86: Sparta Bertrange
 1986–87: Sparta Bertrange
 1987–88: Contern
 1988–89: Union Sportive Hiefenech
 1989–90: Union Sportive Hiefenech
 1990–91: Union Sportive Hiefenech
 1991–92: Etzella
 1992–93: Résidence
 1993–94: Résidence
 1994–95: Résidence
 1995–96: Union Sportive Hiefenech
 1996–97: Résidence
 1997–98: Racing Luxembourg
 1998–99: Etzella
 1999–00: Racing Luxembourg
 2000–01: Contern
 2001–02: AS Soleuvre|Soleuvre
 2002–03: Etzella
 2003–04: Contern
 2004–05: Sparta Bertrange
 2005–06: Etzella
 2006–07: Sparta Bertrange
 2007–08: Sparta Bertrange
 2008–09: Contern
 2009–10: T71 Dudelange
 2010–11: T71 Dudelange
 2011–12: Sparta Bertrange
 2012–13: T71 Dudelange
 2013–14: T71 Dudelange
 2014–15: T71 Dudelange
 2015–16: Amicale Steesel
 2016–17: Amicale Steesel
 2017–18: Amicale Steesel
 2018–19: Etzella
 2019–20: None
 2020–21: T71 Dudelange
 2021–22: Amicale Steesel

Source:

Finals 2003-2021

Performance by club

European competition
Luxembourgian clubs have not participated in European competition since 2002, the last year FIBA organised the FIBA Saporta Cup, with the FLBB bemoaning the separation between FIBA Europe and ULEB and the move away from a single-elimination format. Some of the requirements for participation in the FIBA-organised European third-tier EuroChallenge that restrict their participation are: a €5,000 registration fee notwithstanding other costs, an arena that seats at least 2000 without non-basketball lines, and games played on weekdays.

Highlights

Notes

References

External links
Luxembourg Basketball at eurobasket.com
Luxembourg Basketball news at basketnews.lu

Basketball in Luxembourg
Lux
Sports leagues established in 1933
1933 establishments in Luxembourg